2-Phenyl-3,6-dimethylmorpholine is a drug with stimulant and anorectic effects, related to phenmetrazine. Based on what is known from other phenylmorpholines with similar structure, it likely acts as a serotonin reuptake inhibitor and may produce antidepressant-like effects. Anecdotal reports suggest, however, that the compound is inactive aside from anorectic effects.

See also
 3-Fluorophenmetrazine
 G-130 (2-Phenyl-5,5-dimethylmorpholine)
 3,4-Phendimetrazine (2-Phenyl-3,4-dimethylmorpholine)
 PDM-35 (3,5-Phendimetrazine) (2-Phenyl-3,5-dimethylmorpholine)
 Manifaxine
 Radafaxine

References

Stimulants
Substituted amphetamines
Phenylmorpholines
Designer drugs
Phenyl compounds